Monday Morning Cold is the first album by musician Erin McKeown. It was released in 1999 via her own record label, TVP Records, while she was still a student at Brown University. The album was re-released in 2001 following the success of her second album, Distillation.

Track listing
 Fast As I Can
 Lullaby in Three/Four
 My Hips
 Monday Morning Cold
 Easy Baby
 Softly Moses
 Glass
 Fast As I Can
 How to Open My Heart in 4 Easy Steps
 Something Comes
 You Don't Know

Erin McKeown albums
1999 albums